A wall magazine is a periodical run on a notice board, especially in an educational institute where the students and other members of the institution can post their articles, poems, drawings and other such compositions to share with each other. They can be in the form of collage giving a message.

Wall magazines are a medium within the educational institutions for the students to express their creativity. It can also be utilized as a medium to increase interaction between students by having regular fortnight quizzes, so making it widely known. Certain topics can be discussed by regular posts on an open section. It is an educational and creative way to express messages, history etc.

See also
School Magazine
College Magazine

Education magazines
Student magazines